Penelope Drastik (born 1997) is an Australian chess player.

Chess career 
Drastik qualified for the Women's Chess World Cup 2021, where she was defeated 1½-½ by Marie Sebag in the first round.

Education
As of 2021, Drastik is studying Advanced Maths at the University of Wollongong.

References

External links 
 
 Penelope Drastik chess games at 365Chess.com
 

1997 births
Living people
Australian female chess players